Melissa Mendez (born July 27, 1964) is a Filipina film and TV actress.

Mendez was nominated for a Best Actress FAMAS Award for the film Kalakal (2008). Mendez produced an independent movie, Hilot (2009) with Empress Schuck. It was directed by Neal "Buboy" Tan under Emerge Productions. She was included in the cast of GMA 7's Indio (2013) starring, Bong Revilla.

Personal life
Mendez is sister to actress, Glenda Garcia. She is the cousin of actor Dennis Roldan and actress Isabel Rivas. Melissa Mendez married Erico Gobencion on July 27, 2012.

She has three daughters: Denise (b. 1988), Cassie (b. 1992), and Alex (b. 1998).

In a commercial flight in March 2015, Melissa had a verbal and physical altercation with passengers: businessman Rey Pamaran and Mr. World Philippines 2013 Andrew Wolff. The plane turnaround mid-flight and offloaded her from the plane. She apologized after causing a media frenzy.

Filmography

Film

Television

ABS-CBN
 Anna Luna (1989–94) – Emily Dominguez-Tecson/PilarBayani – Teodora Alonso RealondaEsperanza – ElenaPangako Sa 'Yo – Minerva CapitoSa Puso Ko Iingatan Ka – Nelia DomingoMaalaala Mo Kaya: "Sto. Nino De Cebu" – DaisyMaalaala Mo Kaya: "Family Picture" - Andrea's motherMaalaala Mo Kaya: "Cellphone" – GuestMaalaala Mo Kaya: "Bench" – GuestLovers in Paris – Rowena VizcarraKomiks Presents: Nasaan Ka Maruja? – GuestPrecious Hearts Romances Presents: The Substitute Bride – Josie Lopez-GuttierezMaalaala Mo Kaya: Ketchup – GuestRubi – LiliaMaalaala Mo Kaya: Silbato – Mrs. JavierDahil sa Pag-Ibig – Elena OsorioMaalaala Mo Kaya: Balot – GuestMaalaala Mo Kaya: Saklay – LinaMinsan Lang Kita Iibigin – GuestWansapanataym: Mac Ulit Ulit – GuestWalang Hanggan – Hilda CruzKailangan Ko'y Ikaw – Dina ManriqueAnnaliza – Mother of StellaFPJ's Ang Probinsyano – Mrs. Abella

TV5P.S. I Love You – Stella

GMA NetworkAnna Liza (1980–85) – MelissaGMA Telesine Specials: Kung Saan Sisikat ang Araw (1995) – Arlene Di Ba't Ikaw (1999) – HelenNow and Forever: Dangal (2006) – GuestLupin (2007) – Edith Legarda Carlo J. Caparas' Kamandag (2007–08) – Elena E.S.P (2008) – Guest Luna Mystika (2008–09) – BessieClaudine: "Fraternity" and "Laya" (2010) – GuestTime of My Life (2011) – IngridSpooky Nights: "Sapi" (2011) – NenaBroken Vow (2012) – Amor SantiagoIndio (2013) – Alicia DecenaMy Destiny (2014) – Mrs. ArcillaAng Lihim ni Annasandra (2014–15) – Daria SanchezKarelasyon: "Kasambahay" (2015) – CesKarelasyon: "Coma" (2015) – ZenyDestiny Rose (2015–16) – Yvonne AntonioniDangwa (2015–16) – EstherKarelasyon: "Ate" (2016) – GraceSomeone to Watch Over Me (2016–17) – AdoraMy Love from the Star (2017) - Doris YuzonContessa (2018) - Helen Ramirez vda. de CaballeroThe Lost Recipe (2021) - President AlmonteLas Hermanas (2021) - Divine SarmientoAbot-Kamay na Pangarap (2022)

RPNHanggang Kailan, Anna Luna?: Ikalawang Aklat (1994–95) – Emily Dominguez-Tecson/PilarTierra Sangre'' (1996–99) – Aurora Sangre

References

External links

1964 births
Living people
20th-century Filipino actresses
21st-century Filipino actresses